An Americanist studies the Americas, American culture, or American language. It may refer to:

Americas
 A linguist specializing in the indigenous languages of the Americas
 Americanist phonetic notation
 International Congress of Americanists
 Society of Early Americanists

United States
 A scholar specializing in American studies
 A scholar specializing in politics of the United States

See also
Americanism (disambiguation)